The men's javelin throw event at the 1987 Summer Universiade was held at the Stadion Maksimir in Zagreb on 15 and 16 July 1987. It was the first time that the new model javelin was used at the Games.

Medalists

Results

Qualification

Qualification distance: 70.00 metres

Final

References

Athletics at the 1987 Summer Universiade
1987